Güzide Irmak Bayır (born 2 August 2002) is a Turkish figure skater. She is the 2019 Bosphorus Cup bronze medalist and a five-time Turkish national champion in Advanced Novice, Junior and Senior categories. She qualified to the final segment at the 2017 World Junior Championships in Taipei. She finished 22nd in Taiwan (placing 22nd in the short program and 19th in the free skate), and became the record-holder for the highest points received by a female Turkish skater in World Junior Figure Skating Championships. She has represented Turkey at 18 worldwide competitions in 12 different countries, including 3 seasons of ISU Junior Grand Prix and the European Youth Olympic Festival.

Personal life 
Bayır was born on 2 August 2002 in Ankara, Turkey. She graduated from Bilkent High School, and is currently a third year student at the University of British Columbia majoring in Computer Science.

Programs

Competitive highlights 
CS: Challenger Series; JGP: Junior Grand Prix

References

External links 
 

2002 births
Living people
Sportspeople from Ankara
Turkish female single skaters